Niyazi Sayın (born 1927), is a Turkish ney flautist and music educator. For a long time, he has performed duets with tanbur lute player Necdet Yaşar. He is regarded as the most important ney player in Turkish classical music.

Discography
Modern reissues include:
 2006 - Niyazi Sayın & Necdet Yaşar: Masters of Turkish Music - 2-CD compilation (Kalan Müzik)

References

External links
 Product page for the compilation of duets with Necdet Yaṣar at Kalan Müzik
 All about Niyazi Sayin in the Journal of Reed Flute (Ney dergisi)
 The only interactive forum site following Niyazi Sayin`s path

1927 births
Possibly living people
Haydarpaşa High School alumni
Musicians from Istanbul
Ney players
Turkish flautists
Musicians of Ottoman classical music
Musicians of Turkish makam music